Lisa Kristine Cummins (December 13, 1963 – November 30, 2020) was an American dentist and fashion model, whose image appeared on the cover of Cosmopolitan three times.

Early life and education 
Cummins was born on December 13, 1963, in Killeen, Texas, to Hanny Bijlaard “Louise” and Peter R. Cummins. Her father was accepted by the Wharton School of the University of Pennsylvania, due to which Cummins, along with her family, moved to Springfield. There she attended a public school. After completing high school, she enrolled in Gettysburg College and then acquired a degree in dental medicine from the University of Pennsylvania. She completed tooth replacement and restoration training at Temple University to become a prosthodontist.

Career 
Cummins was 15 years old when Francesco Scavullo, a fashion and celebrity photographer, spotted her in New York while shopping with her parents. She was represented by the Ford Agency during the start of her career as a fashion model.

She was featured on the cover of Cosmopolitan thrice and Francesco Scavullo's book, Scavullo Women, in 1982.

As a prosthodontist, she worked on dental cases for contestants for Miss World, Miss America and Miss Universe pageants. She carried out her solo dental practice in Bala Cynwyd, Pennsylvania.

Death 
Cummins died in Camden, New Jersey, on November 30, 2020, in Cooper University Hospital due to cardiac arrest complications.

References 

1963 births
2020 deaths
American dentists
American female models
People from Killeen, Texas